The R21 highway (in Cyrillic Р21), also known as the Kola Motorway, is a major highway in Russia, running from Saint Petersburg to Murmansk. The highway is part of European route E105 and is the main transportation route by road in the Republic of Karelia and the Murmansk Oblast. Its length is 1592 kilometers. Before 2018, the R21 was designated as M18.

Route

The R21 highway runs from Saint Petersburg, south of Lake Ladoga to Petrozavodsk, Kondopoga, Medvezhyegorsk, Segezha, Kem, Loukhi, Kandalaksha, Polyarnye Zori, Monchegorsk, Olenegorsk, Kola and ends in Severomorsk. It passes the Arctic circle a couple of kilometers south of the border of Karelia and the Murmansk oblast, north of Loukhi.

Landscape
In the Republic of Karelia, the landscape through which the R21 runs is mainly forest (birches), rivers and lakes. In the Murmansk Oblast, the highway runs for the most part through the Kola Peninsula, a severely polluted area. The landscape here is more open and consists partly of half-tundra.

Roads within the Arctic Circle
Roads in Saint Petersburg
Roads in Leningrad Oblast
Roads in the Republic of Karelia
Roads in Murmansk Oblast